Tong Fuk Cheung was a Chinese footballer who played for the Chinese national football team. He was the first captain of the Chinese national team, and scored their very first goal in 1913.

Career statistics

International

International goals
Scores and results list China's goal tally first.

References

1893 births
1953 deaths
Chinese footballers
China international footballers
Association football midfielders